Cook's Ham is a brand of Smithfield Foods that previously prepared and sold smoked and prepared ham. It was founded as Cook Family Foods in 1983, and was an independent firm until acquired by ConAgra in October 1988. It was sold to Smithfield Foods in 2006.  Cook's Ham is produced at facilities in Lincoln, Nebraska, Grayson, Kentucky and Kansas City, Missouri.

Bud Cook, the founder of Cook Family Foods (and its predecessor, Bluebird Foods), died on April 2, 2018.

References

External links
Cook's Ham - brand website

Smithfield Foods brands
Smoked meat